Monika Jansson (born 27 February 1960) is a Swedish female curler.

She was a member of the  team.

She competed at the 1988 Winter Olympics when curling was a demonstration sport.

Teams

References

External links
 

Living people
1960 births
Swedish female curlers
European curling champions
Swedish curling champions
Curlers at the 1988 Winter Olympics
Olympic curlers of Sweden